The women's heptathlon event at the 2019 Summer Universiade was held on 11 and 12 July at the Stadio San Paolo in Naples.

Medalists

Results

100 metres hurdles
Wind:Heat 1: +1.1 m/s, Heat 2: +1.2 m/s, Heat 3: -0.4 m/s

High jump

Shot put

200 metres
Wind:Heat 1: +0.1 m/s, Heat 2: +0.4 m/s, Heat 3: +1.0 m/s

Long jump

Javelin throw

800 metres

Final standings

References

Heptathlon
2019